Agdistis infumata is a moth in the family Pterophoridae. It is known from South Africa.

References

Endemic moths of South Africa
Agdistinae
Moths of Africa
Moths described in 1912